Muscleblind-like protein 2 is a protein that in humans is encoded by the MBNL2 gene.

This gene encodes a C3H-type zinc finger protein, which is similar to the Drosophila melanogaster muscleblind B protein. Drosophila muscleblind is a gene required for photoreceptor differentiation. Several alternatively spliced transcript variants have been described but the full-length natures of only some have been determined.

References

Further reading

External links
 
 

Biology of bipolar disorder